Jem or JEM may refer to:

Arts, entertainment and media

Film and television
 Jem (TV series), or Jem and the Holograms, an American 1980s animated TV series
 Jem and the Holograms (film), a 2015 American musical fantasy film

Literature
 Jem (magazine), a 1950s/1960s American men's monthly
 Jem (novel), by Frederik Pohl, 1979
 "Jem (and Sam)", a 1999 novel by Ferdinand Mount
 Journal of Electronic Materials
 The Journal of Emergency Medicine
 Journal of Experimental Medicine

Music
 Jem (singer) (Jemma Griffiths, born 1975), a Welsh singer songwriter and musician
 J.E.M, a Swedish rap-pop group
 Jem Records, an American record label 1970–1988, resurrected in 2013

Businesses and organisations
 Justice and Equality Movement, a Sudanese opposition group
 Jaish-e-Mohammed, militant Islamist group based in Pakistan
 Jewish Education in Media, the parent company of Jewish Broadcasting Service

Other uses 
 Jem (given name), including a list of people with the name
 Jem (Alevism), a communal worship service
 Jem, Singapore, a shopping mall 
 Japanese Experiment Module, for the International Space Station
 Job-exposure matrix, a tool to assess occupational exposure to health hazards
 Ibanez JEM, an electric guitar model

See also 

Gem (disambiguation)
JemJem, an e-commerce website for refurbished Apple products